Flowers (The Hits Collection) is a greatest hits album of American pop singer Jennifer Paige released by her former record label Hollywood Records.

Track listing
 "Crush"
 Here With Me
 "These Days"
 "Stranded"
 "Always You" (The Ballad Mix)
 "Sober"
 Not This Time
 Get To Me
 Busted
 Questions
 Feel So Farway
 Tell Me When
 You Get Through
 The Edge
 While You Were Gone
 Saturday Girl (demo version)
 "Always You (Bonus Remix)"
 "Crush (Morales radio alt intro)"
DVD (The Videos)
Crush 	3:36
Always You 	3:38
Sober 	4:05
Stranded 	3:35
Making Of... Stranded 	6:01
Making Of... Sober 	3:32
Crush International Interview 	7:57
Crush Asian Tour Footage 	4:04

References

2003 greatest hits albums
Jennifer Paige albums
Hollywood Records compilation albums
Pop compilation albums